Hussein Taher Al-Sabee (born 14 November 1979 in Qatif) is a Saudi Arabian long jumper. His personal best is 8.35 metres, achieved in May 2004 in Modesto, California.

Achievements

References

External links

1979 births
Living people
Saudi Arabian male long jumpers
Athletes (track and field) at the 2000 Summer Olympics
Athletes (track and field) at the 2008 Summer Olympics
Olympic athletes of Saudi Arabia
Asian Games medalists in athletics (track and field)
Athletes (track and field) at the 2002 Asian Games
Athletes (track and field) at the 2006 Asian Games
Athletes (track and field) at the 2010 Asian Games
Goodwill Games medalists in athletics
People from Qatif
Asian Games gold medalists for Saudi Arabia
Asian Games bronze medalists for Saudi Arabia
Medalists at the 2002 Asian Games
Medalists at the 2006 Asian Games
Medalists at the 2010 Asian Games
Competitors at the 2001 Goodwill Games
21st-century Saudi Arabian people